Maria Ivogün (18 November 1891 in Budapest – 3 October 1987 in Beatenberg, Switzerland) was a distinguished soprano singer of Hungarian origin. She was an especially outstanding interpreter of the works of Mozart: her recording of the aria of the Queen of the Night (Die Zauberflöte) became legendary.

Biography and artistic career
Maria Ivogün was born Ilse Kempner. Her father was the Austro-Hungarian Colonel Pál Kempner. She created her professional name by contracting the maiden name of her mother, an Austrian operetta singer named Ida von Günther. She spent the greater part of her childhood and youth in Zürich. From 1909 (other sources say after 1907) she began to study singing and theatre in Vienna. When the young soprano sang in 1913 at the Vienna Hofoper, she was overlooked. However, the house conductor there, Bruno Walter, recognized her outstanding talent and engaged her for his new workplace at the Hofoper in Munich. She gave her debut in Munich in the role of Mimi in Puccini's La bohème. Three years later, in 1916, she sang the role of Zerbinetta in the re-worked version of Ariadne auf Naxos in Vienna at the express wish of the composer Richard Strauss. In the same year she replaced an indisposed singer as Queen of the Night in Mozart's Die Zauberflöte, a role for which Maria Ivogün became very highly regarded and with which she laid the foundation of her success.

By 1916 Ivogün was reckoned among the best female singers in Europe and had roles in operas such as Fidelio (Marzelline), Così fan tutte, Le nozze di Figaro and many others. Moreover she became well known as Zerbinetta in Richard Strauss’ Ariadne auf Naxos.
In 1917 the title of Royal Bavarian Kammersängerin was bestowed upon her. In the same year she sang the boy-role of Ighino in the original production of Hans Pfitzner's Palestrina opposite the tenor Karl Erb in the title-role, whom she married in  1921. In two further important original productions in Munich, Ivogün took on leading roles: in Der Ring des Polykrates of the then barely 19-year-old Erich Wolfgang Korngold (first performance 28 March 1916) she sang Laura, and in Walter Braunfels's Die Vögel (first performance 4 December 1920) she took the part of the Nightingale. In the theatrical season of 1925/1926 Ivogün followed Bruno Walter to the State Opera in Berlin. She remained there as a member of the regular company until 1932. 

In 1932, Ivogün divorced Karl Erb, and in 1933 she married their pianist-accompanist Michael Raucheisen. The highly celebrated soprano made countless concert-tours and guest opera appearances both within Germany and beyond. She appeared above all at La Scala, Milan, the Vienna State Opera, Covent Garden, London and the Chicago Opera. When she fell ill with an eye illness, she ended her operatic career in 1932 and in 1934 her career as a singer of lieder. From 1948 to 1950 Ivogün taught at the Music High School in Vienna, and finally she became a professor at the Hochschule in Berlin. She spent her twilight years in Switzerland, virtually blind. The singer's last resting place was at the side of her second husband, Michael Raucheisen, in the city cemetery of Rain, Switzerland.

Work 
Today, Maria Ivogün is considered to have been one of the best and most distinguished female opera singers of the twentieth century. In the period between the two World Wars, she gave very good account of operatic standards in Germany, through the whole of Europe. Very many recorded performances (also with Karl Erb, her first husband) are to be included among her artistic achievements.

Maria Ivogün worked as the teacher and mentor of many distinguished female singers of opera and entertainment music. Among her students are numbered above all the opera singers Elisabeth Schwarzkopf, Rita Streich, Evelyn Lear, Renate Holm and Helga Kosta; the theatrical singer Gitta Lind, much loved in the 1950s, was her also one of her students.

Selected filmography
The Loves of Casanova (1927)

Discography (selected)
Maria Ivogün – The complete recordings – 17 unpublished items 1916–1919
Die goldene Stimme – Maria Ivogün
Ivogün – Prima Voce Nimbus 7832

Sources

Müller-Gögler, M.: Karl Erb. Das Leben eines Sängers, (Offenburg 1948)
Kutsch, K. J./Riemens, Leo: Großes Sängerlexikon, 1st Vol. (Bern/Stuttgart 1987) 

1891 births
1987 deaths
Musicians from Budapest
German operatic sopranos
20th-century German women opera singers